Poplar Forest is a plantation and plantation house in Forest, Bedford County, Virginia. Founding Father and third U.S. president Thomas Jefferson designed the plantation, and used the property as both a private retreat and a revenue-generating plantation. Jefferson inherited the property in 1773 and began designing and working on the plantation in 1806. While Jefferson is the most famous individual associated with the property, it had several owners before being purchased for restoration, preservation, and exhibition in 1984.

Poplar Forest was designated as a National Historic Landmark in 1971 and is presently operated as a historic house museum by the nonprofit Corporation for Jefferson's Poplar Forest. The corporation is also responsible for the ongoing archaeological study and restoration work at the property.

History
The land upon which Poplar Forest was built shows archaeological evidence of having been populated by native peoples from the Paleo-Indian through Late Woodland periods. The 4,000-acre property was legally defined by a 1745 patent in which William Stith (a colonial minister and planter) assumed ownership, but did not live on the land. He passed ownership to his daughter Elizabeth Pasteur and her cousin Peter Randolph, who maintained ownership until 1764. John Wayles purchased the original property in 1764 and slowly added an additional 819 acres prior to 1770; he was the first to use slave labor on the property. Similar to Stith, Wayles did not live on the property due to his career as an attorney and businessman in Charles City County, Virginia.

Wayles’ daughter Martha Wayles Skelton was married to Thomas Jefferson, and the couple inherited the full 4,819 acres when Wayles died in 1773. The Jeffersons did not immediately continue developing Poplar Forest, nor were they frequent visitors to the property – their focus was on developing Monticello, Thomas's political and legal career, and raising their family. Martha Jefferson died in 1782, and Thomas spent time away from Virginia in public service following her death, serving as Minister to France (1785-1789), Secretary of State (1790-1793), Vice President (1797-1801), and President (1801-1809). Even in Jefferson's absence, the plantation was generating revenue from slave labor under the watch of a general steward and a team of overseers; the slave labor force at Poplar Forest produced annual tobacco and wheat crops after 1790.

Jefferson conducted annual visits to Poplar Forest beginning in 1810 and ending in 1823; he designed Poplar Forest as his retreat from his larger estate at Monticello. The retreat house was completed in 1816 and his visits ranged from a few days to weeklong stays. He frequently brought his granddaughters Ellen and Cornelia Jefferson Randolph to the house after it was completed in 1816, and always traveled to Poplar Forest with a small cadre of enslaved men and women who were based at Monticello. Jefferson maintained sole ownership of the property and the slaves until 1790, when he gave 1,000 acres and six slave families to his daughter Martha and her husband Thomas Mann Randolph Jr. Randolph would later divide and sell the rest of Jefferson's landholdings; he also sold many of Jefferson's slaves to repay debts.

Near the end of his life, Jefferson sought to find permanent residents for the property, and his grandson Francis W. Eppes and wife Mary Elizabeth moved to Poplar Forest shortly after their 1823 marriage. Jefferson died in 1826 having made his last visit to Poplar Forest in 1823. The Eppeses sold Poplar Forest in November 1828 to William Cobbs; Cobbs assigned the task of managing the property to his son in law Edward Hutter in 1840 following his marriage to Cobb's daughter Emma. This period from 1745 to 1840 in which Poplar Forest was sold many times in quick succession meant that many enslaved men, women, and children were separated from their families as the owners settled their predecessor's debts. The Cobbs and Hutter families maintained ownership of Poplar Forest into the twentieth century. The Hutter's son Christian purchased the property in the late nineteenth century and used it as a summer home and working farm into the 1940s employing labor from both black and white hired farmhands and tenant farmers.

Christian Hutter sold the property to James Watts’ family in 1946; the Watts family operated Poplar Forest as a dairy farm and worked with Phelps Barnum and W. Stuart Thompson to restore the house to the way it appeared during Jefferson's time. They also did significant landscape development, and sold a majority of the remaining land to a developer who constructed a nine-hole golf course and a lake along the eastern and southern part of the property.

Dr. James Johnson purchased the house and 50 acres of land from the Watts family in 1980 and then the nonprofit Corporation for Jefferson's Poplar Forest purchased the acreage and the remaining physical structures on the property in 1984. The organization has worked in recent years to reacquire land within the original plantation boundaries, and as of 2008 owned 617 acres of the original property.

Architectural design  
When construction began at Poplar Forest in 1806, Jefferson was still President of the United States. He supervised the construction from Washington, DC. Thomas Jefferson was a self-taught architect known for his work at Monticello and the Virginia State Capitol; he frequently borrowed designs from classical sources, and was attracted to Palladio's classical architecture in the Veneto as well as designs from 16th century France. Jefferson designed Poplar Forest as his personal retreat house and selected the property because of its distance from his public life.

The octagonal house may have been the first of its kind to have been built in the United States. The house at Poplar Forest is made of brick and has an octagonal floor plan; it consists of a central square space and three sides made of elongated octagon rooms. There is an entry hall on the remaining side of the house, which is two smaller rooms divided by a short entry hall. There is a skylight in the central dining room and its dimensions are 20’ x 20’ x 20’, which makes it a perfect cube. Jefferson also elected to add pedimented porticoes on low arcades that were attached to both the northern and southern facades as well as the east and west stairwells. Scholars agree that the retreat house at Poplar Forest is an excellent example of octagonal symmetry; Jefferson's design for the building reflects a consistent geometric approach likely made possible by his well-known proficiency in algebra, geometry, trigonometry, and Newtonian calculus.

Post-Jeffersonian modifications and preservation
By different owners, the main house underwent many alterations, and the plantation's acreage was incrementally reduced to 50 acres (20 ha) at the time of acquisition by the Corporation for Jefferson's Poplar Forest. There was a fire in 1845; the Cobbs and Hutter families chose to rebuild in the Greek revival style and to add an attic story for sleeping; this modified the interior plan of the house. The original walls, chimney, and columns remained after the renovation.

The Corporation for Jefferson's Poplar Forest is using early 19th-century building materials including heavy timber-frame construction, hemp sash cord, iron hardware from Colonial Williamsburg as well as 19th-century building techniques in their restoration work including column rendering and burning limestone to produce traditional lime mortar and plaster. The goal of the restorations is to restore Poplar Forest to Jefferson's original architectural vision.

Slavery 
Slaves were present on the property from 1766 through 1865, when slavery was formally abolished in the United States. Present-day knowledge of the slave populations and their contributions to Poplar Forest is based on both archaeological and archival evidence. John Wayles used slave labor to originally develop roadwork on the property, and when Thomas and Martha Jefferson inherited the land that included Poplar Forest from Wayles, they also inherited 135 enslaved men, women, and children as well as other tracts of land in Amherst, Cumberland, Charles City, Goochland, and Powhatan counties. Because Wayles chose to split his estate among several heirs, slave families were separated in order for his heirs to pay his debts.

As Jefferson turned more attention to Poplar Forest, he brought slaves from Monticello, Elk Hill, Indian Camp, and Judith's Creek, thus increasing the slave population at Poplar Forest. Jefferson kept consistent records of the slaves living at Poplar Forest; these records show that the slave population fluctuated between as few as 28 and as many as 95 individual slaves were working at Poplar Forest between the years 1774 and 1819. As an active participant in the slave trade, Jefferson sold and purchased slaves throughout the time he owned Poplar Forest, including a sale of 40 slaves from his various properties in Bedford County, Virginia in the 1790s. The Eppeses inherited the house, about 1,075 acres of land, and several enslaved men and women after Jefferson's death in 1826. The Cobbs and Hutter families also used slave labor on the property through emancipation and maintained some former slaves as hired workers following.

Plantation and slave economics 
Beginning in 1790, the slaves at Poplar Forest initially grew tobacco and livestock for profit, and later began growing wheat. Records from Edward Hutter's tenure at Poplar Forest show that slaves were regularly tasked with tilling fields and digging ditches in addition to their work growing and harvesting plants to be sold at market. Slaves worked six days each week, and were also responsible for constructing and maintaining their housing structures. Scholars have determined that the enslaved community at Poplar Forest devised a commerce system amongst themselves; slaves were allowed a small plot of land with which to grow food and produce goods that could be traded or sold to fellow slaves as well as the owners' families and the outside market. Archaeologists at Poplar Forest have uncovered clothing accessories such as buttons, glass beads, gilt chains, aiglet/lace tips, and fancy buckles that were likely used as currency amongst slaves at Poplar Forest and the surrounding plantations.

Documents from the 19th century show that the transition from tobacco-based to mixed-crop plantation agriculture left Poplar Forest with an abundance of laborers; William Cobbs, in particular, is known to have hired out slaves from the plantation to external projects. Other individual slaves (including two women named Lucy and Matilda) are known to have had access to money during this time so that they could buy items on behalf of the Cobbs/Hutter families. Edward Hutter regularly leased slaves from Poplar Forest to businesses and planters in Bedford County.

Family networks 
Records show that by the 1790s, there were seven different slave families represented at Poplar Forest. Jefferson encouraged common-law unions amongst the slaves, and recorded the birth dates of each slave born on the property. He also rewarded women who married a fellow slave from Poplar Forest with a pot; archaeologists have found remnants of these gifts in archaeological studies of the property. Jefferson kept records of family connections - surviving records have allowed scholars to conclude that multiple generations of single families were enslaved at Poplar Forest and had relatives strewn about other plantations in Virginia. William and Marian Cobbs inherited a slave family that included Mary and her daughters Lucy and Matilda (who are recorded to have worked as house servants) as well as other siblings and extended family members.

Known enslaved people 
Hannah was not born at Poplar Forest, but served there from the time she was a teenager until ca.1821. She married and had a family with a fellow slave, was literate, and worked for a time as Jefferson's housekeeper.

James (Jame) Hubbard was purchased by Jefferson when he was 30 and went on to oversee field laborers at Poplar Forest. He fathered six children with a fellow slave named Cate and fostered several others, and worked as a hogkeeper when he was older. Scholars are also able to trace his family members and their roles at Poplar Forest, which included Nace, Hannah, Nancy, Joan, James, and Phill.

Phill was born at Poplar Forest to James Hubbard and his wife Cate. Phill briefly worked at Monticello before returning to Poplar Forest, where he married Hanah and had a son. He died at age 33, reportedly of poisoning.

William (Billy) was born at Poplar Forest and violently rebelled against slavery by attacking an overseer on more than one occasion. Jefferson sent him and three others to Louisiana, where William attempted to run away, but was caught and sold.

John Hemmings never lived at Poplar Forest, but documentary records show that he was responsible for much of the interior woodwork in the retreat house at Poplar Forest.

Lydia Johnson lived at Poplar Forest when Edward Hutter owned the property. She named one of her children Ida Reeder, after Hutter's niece; expense records show that he purchased a dress for her as a gift. Lydia continued to work for the family after Emancipation until she died in 1919.

Will appears in a ledger from 1772 noting that he purchased rum, buttons, thread, and cloth.

Archaeology 
There have been several archaeological digs at Poplar Forest since the archaeology program began in 1989; the 1993 accidental discovery of building remnants used by African American slaves when staff members were checking the ground for objects of historical significance before planting trees initiated a stronger focus on the archaeology of the plantation's enslaved residents. Initial digs revealed that the ground on the hillside east of the poplar grove had been farmed; this discovery led to the discovery of a small cellar of a structure dating to Jefferson's time at the property.

More recent excavations focused on an area believed to have held paper mulberry trees; Jefferson planted two rows in order to help create naturalistic wings to complement the Palladian style of his retreat house. Archaeologists at Poplar Forest found stains in the ground indicating areas in which trees were previously planted, and their goal is to analyze the levels of charcoal and pollen to determine which areas were most likely the original location(s) for the paper mulberry trees. Other ongoing and future excavation plans include the area surrounding an antebellum slave cabin as well as Jefferson's ornamental plant nursery.

Slaves at Poplar Forest participated in an informal economy by trading and selling objects as well as hiring themselves out or being hired out for paid work. Archaeological excavations have revealed objects that offer scholars a more complete idea of the types of objects and work that were valued in this economy. Future excavations will be geared towards determining the landscape as it was when Jefferson designed and spent time at Poplar Forest so that the present-day museum can re-create Jefferson's vision for visitors.

Slave sites 
Archaeological excavations of Poplar Forest have yielded evidence suggesting that maps of Poplar Forest created in Jefferson's time were incomplete and did not illustrate the extent to which slaves were present. Current scholarship suggests that the enslaved men and women at Poplar Forest lived and worked at one of three sites, but it is possible that there were even more than are currently known.

Old plantation / North Hill site 
The Old Plantation/North Hill is believed to have been established in the 1770s/1780s and was the site of the oldest slave farm structures at Poplar Forest dating from 1764, and maps suggest that the original structures included an overseer house, large barn, and slave housing built over the course of 40 years. Scholars also refer to this area as the Old Quarter, and it was located to the south and west of the main house.

Wingos quarter site 
The Wingo quarter farm dates from 1790 to 1812 at Poplar Forest and was operational when Jefferson owned Poplar Forest; he gave the land on which it was located to Martha and Thomas Mann Randolph as a wedding present. Jefferson's surviving notes tell us that three carpenters were able to construct a slave cabin in three days and that the slaves most often lived next to their field or shop work sites. Documentary evidence suggests that the slave housing structures at Poplar Forest were made of logs and that each house had two rooms that each measured 12.5 x 15 feet; this is corroborated by archaeological evidence suggesting that the slave structures contained root cellars designed by the occupants, which were used to store clothing, tools, and iron hardware. Archaeologists used soil stains to discover storage pits, burned tree roots, and postoles; this analysis also yielded fragments of glass, ceramics, and iron which were discovered to have been parts of plates, bottles, and cooking pots. One other structure discovered is believed to have functioned as a smokehouse as well as a residence, while a third is believed to have been built later than the other two, and used primarily as housing. Soil analysis also suggests that there were fences in the slave quarters.

Excavations at this site also yielded a number of objects related to slave life at Poplar Forest. Archaeologists discovered iron saw files, gimlets, wedges, croze irons, and a hinge from a folding ruler; it is likely that these objects are from tools used by slaves either in their work assignments or in their personal space. Scissors, straight pins, and thimbles found at the site suggest that women sewed for both work and for their families. The excavations uncovered stoneware and earthenware that scholars believe to have been used to prepare food; enslaved men and women at Poplar Forest ate fruits and vegetables as well as beef, pork, venison, opossum, rabbit, chicken, turkey, and fish, and possibly had access to firearms with which to hunt animals.

Site A 
This is the newest of the three sites; current scholarship indicates that it was built in the 1830s and was operational until emancipation. Scholars believe that the site was home to a slave cabin likely occupied between 1840 and 1860. Archaeologists have uncovered a 3 ft. pit that would have been located underneath the floor of the cabin, postholes, and remnants of a shone chimney. The excavation at Site A has yielded buttons, straight pins, needles, thimbles, and the bone cap of a needle case; this suggests that this site may have been the home of a seamstress.

Present day 
The Corporation for Thomas Jefferson's Poplar Forest has been in charge of Poplar Forest since 1984, when the 501(c)(3) organization purchased 50 acres of land and the original buildings with the goal to preserve the estate for the educational benefit of the public. The corporation currently operates Poplar Forest as a historic house museum and cites their mission as seeking to both preserve Thomas Jefferson's personal retreat and inspire visitors to explore Jefferson's legacy.

Poplar Forest first welcomed visitors in 1986, and presently conducts guided tours thematically dedicated to the main retreat house and the enslaved community in addition to its ongoing restoration and archaeological work. The property is a National Historic Landmark and designated a Virginia History Trails site as part of Virginia's 2019 Commemoration.

See also 
 Jeffersonian architecture
 List of National Historic Landmarks in Virginia
 National Register of Historic Places listings in Bedford County, Virginia

References

External links 

Poplar Forest, State Route 661, Forest, Bedford County, VA: 75 photos, 10 color transparencies, 22 measured drawings, 6 data pages, and 6 photo caption pages at Historic American Buildings Survey
"Thomas Jefferson's Poplar Forest", website of the Corporation for Jefferson's Poplar Forest
Thomas Jefferson's architecture, University of Virginia

Slave cabins and quarters in the United States
Jefferson family residences
Thomas Jefferson buildings
National Historic Landmarks in Virginia
Octagon houses in Virginia
Museums in Bedford County, Virginia
Houses completed in 1826
Historic house museums in Virginia
Presidential homes in the United States
Plantation houses in Virginia
Presidential museums in Virginia
Palladian Revival architecture in Virginia
Houses in Bedford County, Virginia
Historic American Buildings Survey in Virginia
Houses on the National Register of Historic Places in Virginia
National Register of Historic Places in Bedford County, Virginia
1806 establishments in Virginia
Homes of United States Founding Fathers